Aganope is a genus of flowering plants in the legume family, Fabaceae. It belongs to the subfamily Faboideae.

Species 
Plants of the World Online accepts the following species within Aganope:

 Aganope agastyamalayana M.B.Viswan., Manik. & Tangav.
 Aganope balansae (Gagnep.) L.K.Phan
 Aganope dinghuensis (P.Y.Chen) T.C.Chen & Pedley
 Aganope gabonica (Baill.) Polhill
 Aganope heptaphylla (L.) Polhill
 Aganope impressa (Dunn) Polhill
 Aganope leucobotrya (Dunn) Polhill
 Aganope lucida (Welw. ex Baker) Polhill
 Aganope polystachya (Benth.) Thoth. & D.N.Das
 Aganope stuhlmannii (Taub.) Adema
 Aganope thyrsiflora (Benth.) Polhill

References 

Millettieae
Fabaceae genera